The Café is a British sitcom written by and starring Ralf Little and Michelle Terry broadcast by Sky1.

The series premiered on 23 November 2011.

Premise
The series is set in and around a café in Weston-super-Mare run by generational trio Mary (June Watson), Carol (Ellie Haddington) and Sarah (Michelle Terry).

Cast
Ellie Haddington as Carol Porter
Michelle Terry as Sarah Porter
June Watson as Mary Ellis
Ralf Little as Richard Dickens
Phoebe Waller-Bridge as Chloe Astill
Kevin Trainor as Keiran Barker
David Troughton as Stan Astill
Seeta Indrani as Brenda Kiely
Brian Murphy as Jack Dobson
Marcia Warren as Alice Dobson
Carolin Stoltz as Ava Lipinski
Daniel Ings as John Streatfield (series 1)
Jack Roth as Big Issue Frank (series 1)
Robert Glenister as Phil Porter (series 2)
Kobna Holdbrook-Smith as Jason (series 2)

Production
The series is co-written by two of its lead actors, Ralf Little and Michelle Terry. The first series was directed by Craig Cash, writer and cast member of The Royle Family (which also starred Little). The series was filmed in Weston-super-Mare. The first series was filmed in early 2011 whilst the second series was filmed throughout June, July and August 2012. The cafe set was built for the show. Cash and Little both worked together on The Royle Family. Little and Terry met around 2008 whilst performing a sketch together at the Bush Theatre for the Latitude Festival.

The title song for the series is the pop standard "Beyond the Sea", which was sung by Kathryn Williams.

Building and legacy
The 11 m (36 ft) octagonal cafe building - which included a veranda and dovecote turret - was specially constructed, sited on Weston's sea front and after cancellation was put into storage. There was later an application for it be re-constructed and re-located to Hamilton Park in Taunton, Somerset. However, despite planning consent being achieved, the process proved too difficult and time consuming, and instead it was auctioned off for charity eBay, with the money raised going to the Army Benevolent Fund and The Baton charities.

Episodes

Series 1 (2011)

Series 2 (2013)

Reception
Mark Webster of Sabotage Times had this to say about the doubled-billed premier: "Over the last couple of years or so, Sky One have clearly made a consolidated effort to present themselves as a channel that wants to do its business just like their buddies over on terrestrial, and in giving this gently lapping little comedy space alongside the likes of 'Ross Kemp On..', 'A League Of Their Own' and David Walliams 'Wall Of Fame', they are proving they've got the chops to do it".

Tom Meltzer of The Guardian gave the series a mixed review. "In fairness to the writers, their performances are both consistently excellent, and the direction is both naturalistic and nicely understated. But while, as the name suggests, the show owes a clear debt to The Office in its style, it sadly failed to nick Gervais and Merchant's knack for writing characters, stories and, crucially, jokes".

Cancelled DVD release
The complete first series of The Café was set to be released in 2013 to coincide with series two's television airing. However, in August 2014 it was decided that the release would be cancelled indefinitely due to poor ratings. It is unknown if or when the series will be released.

References

External links
 Official website
 
 

2010s British sitcoms
2011 British television series debuts
2013 British television series endings
Sky sitcoms
English-language television shows
Sky UK original programming
Television shows set in Somerset
Weston-super-Mare